A pureNRG Christmas is the third studio album by Christian band pureNRG. The album consists of covers of Christmas carols.

Track listing

Track information and credits were taken from the CD liner notes.

References

External links
Kevin Welch Official Site

PureNRG albums
2008 Christmas albums
Christmas albums by American artists